Songjiang University Town or Songjiang University City is a tertiary education hub located in the outskirts of Shanghai in Songjiang District.

The university town was established in 2000 and had its foundations built in 2005. It has an area of 8000 mu (approx. 533 hectares). The university town area is the biggest tertiary education hubs in mainland China, including 7 higher education institutions.

Universities
The following universities have campuses in the university town:
Shanghai International Studies University
Donghua University
Shanghai Institute of Visual Art
East China University of Political Science and Law
Shanghai University of International Business and Economics (formerly Shanghai Institute of Foreign Trade)
Shanghai Lixin University of Commerce
Shanghai University of Engineering Sciences

Transport
The university town can be reached via the Shanghai Metro: Songjiang University Town station.

References

Universities and colleges in Shanghai
Songjiang District